The 2019 Forward Madison FC season was the inaugural season in the soccer team's history, where they competed in the third division of American soccer, USL League One, the first season of the competition. Forward Madison FC also participated in the 2019 U.S. Open Cup. Forward Madison FC played their home games at Breese Stevens Field, located in Madison, Wisconsin, United States.

Overview
The USL League One schedule was announced on December 10, 2018.

Club

Roster

Out on loan

Coaching staff

Front office staff

Transfers

Transfers in

Transfers out

Kits
 Shirt sponsor: Dairyland Insurance
 Shirt manufacturer: Hummel

Exhibitions

Competitions

Overview

USL League One

Standings

Results summary

Results by round

Matches

USL League One Playoffs

U.S. Open Cup

Statistics

Appearances and goals

Goalscorers

Assist scorers

Clean sheets

Disciplinary record

Honors and awards

USL League One Yearly Awards

Individual awards

All-League Team

USL League One Monthly Awards

USL League One Weekly Awards

Player of the Week

Goal of the Week

Save of the Week

Team of the Week

References

External links
 

2018-19
Forward Madison
Forward Madison
Forward Madison